Krasnogorsk is the name of several inhabited localities in Russia.

Urban localities
Krasnogorsk, Moscow Oblast, a city in Krasnogorsky District of Moscow Oblast

Rural localities
Krasnogorsk, Sakhalin Oblast, a selo in Tomarinsky District of Sakhalin Oblast